The Scandic Victoria Tower is a skyscraper hotel in the Kista district of Stockholm, Sweden. It is also known as the Victoria Tower, however the Scandic name is used to distinguish it from the Victoria Tower that forms the southwest end of the Palace of Westminster. The 117 metre hotel is one of the tallest buildings in Stockholm, as well as the tallest hotel in Scandinavia. It is named for Crown Princess Victoria, the heir apparent to the Swedish throne.

See also
 List of tallest buildings in Stockholm

References

External links
 Official Scandic Victoria Tower Hotel website

Hotels in Stockholm
Skyscraper hotels
Skyscrapers in Sweden
Hotels established in 2011
Hotel buildings completed in 2011
2011 establishments in Sweden